The name Kerala Varma may refer to many people from many royal families from the Indian state of Kerala.

People
Kevy (cartoonist), political cartoonist from Kerala

From Cochin Royal Family
 Maharaja Veera Kerala Varma (Kerala Bhoja Raja) (Ruling period: 1809 to 1828, a.k.a. Mithuna Maasathil Theepetta Valiya Thampuran)
 Maharaja Veera Kerala Varma (Ruling period: 1851 to 1853, a.k.a. Kashiyil Theepetta Valiya Thampuran)
 Maharaja Kerala Varma Thampuran (Ruling period: 1888 to 1895, a.k.a. Chinga Maasathil Theepetta Valiya Thampuran)
 Maharaja Kerala Varma Thampuran (Ruling period: 1941 to 1943, a.k.a. Midukkan Thampuran)
 Maharaja Kerala Varma Thampuran (Ruling period: 1946 to 1948, a.k.a. Ikyakeralam Thampuran)
Kerala Varma Kelappan Thampuran: Cricketer (born 1937)

From Pazhassi Royal Family
Pazhassi Raja (principal leader of the Kotiote Palassi rebellion against the East India Company, 1753–1805), one of the earliest freedom fighters in India

From Pandalam Royal Family
Pandalam Kerala Varma: Poet and publisher (1879–1919)

From other Royal Families
Kerala Varma Valiya Koil Thampuran: Poet and translator (1845–1914)
 Kings from Later Chera Dynasty